KLSI may refer to:

 KLSI (FM), a radio station (107.3 FM) licensed to serve Mooreland, Oklahoma, United States
 KYRA (FM), a radio station (92.7 FM) licensed to serve Thousand Oaks, California, United States, which held the call sign KLSI from 2012 to 2013